Belgium participated in the Eurovision Song Contest 2006 with the song "Je t'adore" written by Kate Ryan, Niklas Bergwall, Niclas Kings and Lisa Greene. The song was performed by Kate Ryan. The Belgian entry for the 2006 contest in Athens, Greece was selected through the national final Eurosong '06, organised by the Flemish broadcaster Vlaamse Radio- en Televisieomroeporganisatie (VRT). The competition featured twenty-eight competing entries and consisted of seven shows. In the final on 19 February 2006, "Je t'adore" performed by Kate Ryan was selected as the winner via the votes of seven jury groups and a public televote.

Belgium competed in the semi-final of the Eurovision Song Contest which took place on 18 May 2006. Performing during the show in position 7, "Je t'adore" was not announced among the top 10 entries of the semi-final and therefore did not qualify to compete in the final. It was later revealed that Belgium placed twelfth out of the 23 participating countries in the semi-final with 69 points.

Background

In 2005, Nuno Resende represented the country with the song "Le grand soir", placing twenty-second in the semi-final and failing to advance to the final.

The Belgian broadcaster for the 2006 contest, who broadcasts the event in Belgium and organises the selection process for its entry, was Vlaamse Radio- en Televisieomroeporganisatie (VRT). The Belgian participation in the contest alternates between two broadcasters: the Flemish VRT and the Walloon Radio Télévision Belge de la Communauté Française (RTBF). Both broadcasters have selected the Belgian entry using national finals and internal selections in the past. In 2004 and 2005, both VRT and RTBF organised a national final in order to select the Belgian entry. On 19 June 2005, VRT confirmed Belgium's participation in the 2006 Eurovision Song Contest and announced that the Eurosong national final would be held to select their entry.

Before Eurovision

Eurosong '06 

Eurosong '06 was the national final that selected Belgium's entry in the Eurovision Song Contest 2006. The competition consisted of seven shows that commenced on 8 January 2006 and concluded with a final on 19 February 2006 where the winning song and artist were selected. All shows took place at the Studio 100 in Schelle, hosted by Bart Peeters and were broadcast on Eén.

Format 
Twenty-eight entries were selected to compete in Eurosong. Four heats took place on 8, 15, 22 and 29 January 2006 with each show featuring seven entries. The top three as determined by an expert jury, a press jury, a Radio 2 jury, a Radio Donna jury and public televoting qualified to the semi-finals. The expert jury also selected two wildcards out of the non-qualifying acts in the heats to advance. Two semi-finals took place on 5 and 12 February 2006 with each show featuring seven entries. The top three as determined by the four jury groups and public televoting qualified to the final, while the expert jury also selected a wildcard out of the non-qualifying acts in the semi-finals to advance. The final took place on 19 February 2006 where the winner was chosen by an expert jury, a press jury, a Radio 2 jury, a Radio Donna jury, three international jury groups and public televoting. Each jury group had an equal stake in the result during all shows, while the public televote had a weighting equal to the votes of two jury groups in the heats and the semi-finals and three jury groups in the final.

During each of the seven shows, the expert jury provided commentary and feedback to the artists as well as selected entries to advance in the competition. The experts were:

 Yasminesinger and television presenter
 Marcel Vanthiltsinger and television presenter
 André VermeulenBelgian commentator at the Eurovision Song Contest
 Johnny LoganIrish singer-songwriter, winner of the Eurovision Song Contest 1980 and 1987

Competing entries
A submission period was opened on 19 June 2005 for artists and songwriters to submit their entries until 28 September 2005. The twenty-eight acts selected by VRT for the competition from 321 entries received during the submission period were announced on 6 December 2005. Among the competing artists were former Eurovision Song Contest participants Barbara Dex, who represented Belgium in 1993, and Vanessa Chinitor, who represented Belgium in 1999.

Shows

Heats
The four heats took place on 8, 15, 22 and 29 January 2006. In each show seven entries competed and the combination of results from an expert jury, a press jury, two radio jury groups and a public televote determined the top three that qualified to the semi-finals. An additional two entries were awarded wildcards by the expert jury from the remaining non-qualifying acts in the heats to proceed to the semi-finals.

Semi-finals 
The two semi-finals took place on 5 and 12 February 2006. In each show seven entries competed and the combination of results from an expert jury, a press jury, two radio jury groups and a public televote determined the top three that qualified to the final. "P.O.W.E.R." performed by Brahim was awarded a wildcard by the expert jury from the non-qualifying acts in the semi-finals to proceed to the final.

Final 
The final took place on 19 February 2006 where the seven entries that qualified from the preceding two semi-finals competed. The winner, "Je t'adore" performed by Kate Ryan, was selected by the combination of results from an expert jury, a press jury, two radio jury groups, three international jury groups and a public televote. The international jury groups were selected following a study conducted by two independent professors in statistics on the three best forecasters of the Eurovision Song Contest in recent years.

Ratings

Promotion 
Kate Ryan made several appearances across Europe to specifically promote "Je t'adore" as the Belgian Eurovision entry. Ryan took part in promotional activities in Macedonia on 7 April and performed during the HRT 1 programme Studio 10 in Croatia on 8 April. On 9 April, Ryan appeared in and performed during the TV SLO1 programme Spet doma in Slovenia. Ryan also took part in promotional activities in Greece on 13 and 14 April which included performances during the ANT1 show Proinos Kafes, and in Malta between 15 and 17 April where she appeared during the special Eurovision shows Lejn il-Eurovision on NET TV and Eurovision Fever on Super One TV. On 22 April, Ryan performed in Turkey during the Star TV show Popstar Türkiye. On 4 May, Ryan completed promotional activities in the Netherlands where she appeared during the talk shows RTL Boulevard on RTL 4 and Jensen! on RTL 5. The promotional tour also featured television and radio appearances in Cyprus, Germany, Latvia, Sweden and Switzerland, and was financially supported by Flemish Minister of Culture Bert Anciaux and Kate Ryan's record company EMI with each of them allocating a subsidy of €60,000.

At Eurovision
According to Eurovision rules, all nations with the exceptions of the host country, the "Big Four" (France, Germany, Spain and the United Kingdom) and the ten highest placed finishers in the 2005 contest are required to qualify from the semi-final on 18 May 2006 in order to compete for the final on 20 May 2006; the top ten countries from the semi-final progress to the final. On 21 March 2006, a special allocation draw was held which determined the running order for the semi-final and Belgium was set to perform in position 7, following the entry from Albania and before the entry from Ireland. At the end of the semi-final, Belgium was not announced among the top 10 entries and therefore failed to qualify to compete in the final. It was later revealed that Belgium placed twelfth in the semi-final, receiving a total of 69 points.

The semi-final and the final were broadcast in Belgium by both the Flemish and Walloon broadcasters. VRT broadcast the shows on één with commentary in Dutch by Bart Peeters and André Vermeulen. RTBF televised the shows on La Une with commentary in French by Jean-Pierre Hautier. All shows were also broadcast by VRT on Radio 2 with commentary in Dutch by Michel Follet and Sven Pichal, and by RTBF on La Première with commentary in French by Patrick Duhamel and Thomas Gunzig. The Belgian spokesperson, who announced the Belgian votes during the final, was Yasmine who held up a placard with the words "We Love Kate Ryan" during the final.

Voting 
Below is a breakdown of points awarded to Belgium and awarded by Belgium in the semi-final and grand final of the contest. The nation awarded its 12 points to Armenia in the semi-final and the final of the contest.

Points awarded to Belgium

Points awarded by Belgium

References

2006
Countries in the Eurovision Song Contest 2006
Eurovision